Konrad Grilc (25 October 1909 – 28 April 2002) was a Slovenian gymnast. He competed at the 1936 Summer Olympics and the 1948 Summer Olympics.

References

1909 births
2002 deaths
Slovenian male artistic gymnasts
Olympic gymnasts of Yugoslavia
Gymnasts at the 1936 Summer Olympics
Gymnasts at the 1948 Summer Olympics
Sportspeople from Celje